Benzenediazonium tetrafluoroborate is an organic compound with the formula [C6H5N2]BF4. It is a salt of a diazonium cation and tetrafluoroborate. It exists as a colourless solid that is soluble in polar solvents. It is the parent member of the aryldiazonium compounds, which are widely used in organic chemistry.

Synthesis 
Diazotization of aniline in the presence of hydrochloric acid:
 C6H5NH2 + HNO2 + HCl → [C6H5N2]Cl + 2 H2O
The tetrafluoroborate can be obtained from crude benzenediazonium chloride by salt metathesis using tetrafluoroboric acid. 
  [C6H5N2]Cl + HBF4 → [C6H5N2]BF4 +  HCl

The tetrafluoroborate is more stable than the chloride.

Properties

The diazo group (N2) can be replaced by many other groups, usually anions, giving a variety of substituted phenyl derivatives:
C6H5N2+ + Nu− → C6H5Nu + N2
These transformations are associated with many named reactions including the Schiemann reaction, Sandmeyer reaction, and Gomberg-Bachmann reaction. A wide range of groups that can be used to replace N2 including halide, SH−, CO2H−, OH−. Of considerable practical value in the dye industry are the diazo coupling reactions.

The reaction of phenyldiazonium salts with aniline gives 1,3-diphenyltriazene.

The structure of the salt has been verified by X-ray crystallography. The N-N bond distance is 1.083(3) Å.

Safety
Whereas the chloride salt is explosive, the tetrafluoroborate is readily isolated.

References

Benzene derivatives
Diazo compounds
Tetrafluoroborates
Phenyl compounds